Webster 'Webby' Chikabala (27 March 1965 – 27 December 1997) was a Zambian football player and coach. Seen by many as one of the best players of his generation, he represented his country at the African Cup of Nations  in 1990 and 1992. He was the first Zambian to play professional football in Portugal when he joined Maritimo in August 1990.  He died in 1998.

Club career
Chikabala was born in Chambishi and spent his youth years with the local team FAZ Division I, Chambishi Blackburn (now called Chambishi FC) before moving to Mufulira Blackpool in 1984 where he spent two seasons and thereafter joined Ndola side Vitafoam United in 1986. 

A skilful attacking midfielder who could also play as a target man, his performances attracted the attention of  Nchanga Rangers and he signed for them in early 1987. Nicknamed ‘Mukishi Joe’ he augmented a good Rangers frontline featuring Stone Nyirenda, Goeffrey Mulenga, Gilbert Mukumbo, Godfrey Kangwa, Benjamin Bwalya  and Bruce Mwape, and when Nyirenda left in mid-1987 to join Belgian club Harelbeke, he took over as the team’s centre-forward.

Chikabala was one of the leading players in the Zambian league over the next three seasons though silverware eluded him as he failed to win a trophy with Rangers, with their best placed league finish being third in 1990, the year in which he left before the end of the season to join Maritimo in August 1990. and became the first Zambian player to play for a Portuguese club.

A year later, Chikabala signed a two-year deal with Eendracht Aalst in Belgium and disclosed that he was owed US$13,000 in unpaid wages by Maritmo after the Portuguese side went bankrupt.  Then in December 1992, he was suspended indefinitely by FIFA when it transpired that he had signed the Aalst deal while still under contract with Maritimo. 

The ban was lifted in March 1993 when Maritmo withdrew their claim and he was allowed to resume his career with Aalst. Later that year, Chikabala suffered poor health and after undergoing tests, was found to be HIV+. This sent shock waves through the club and effectively spelt the end of his career. When his contract expired, he returned to Chingola in the hope of rejoining Rangers but when he was not offered a contract, he signed for his boyhood club Chambishi who were also in the Premier League at the time, as player-coach.

He however did not stay long at Chambishi, moving to Zimbabwe to join Mhangura FC in the same capacity. Chikabala’s younger brother Billy also played for Rangers and later joined him at Mhangura.

International career
Chikabala first played for Zambia Schools and got his first call up to the senior national team as Zambia prepared for the 1987 CECAFA tournament. After Zambia were thrashed 4–0 by Uganda in their opening game he was named in the starting line-up in the next game against Uganda and he scored a debut goal in a 2–2 draw.

He held his own in a star-studded Zambia team and featured at the 1988 Summer Olympics where Zambia reached the quarter-finals and when Zambia qualified to CAN 1990, he was Zambia’s star performer in a team without Kalusha Bwalya, Charles Musonda and Ashols Melu. He scored the only goal of the match, heading in a corner as Zambia over powered Cameroon in their opening game of the tournament. He led the team to the semi-finals where they lost to Nigeria but he scored his second goal of the tournament in the match for third place when Zambia defeated Senegal 1–0. For his efforts, he was named in the team of the tournament alongside Algeria’s Djamel Menad in attack.

Two years later, Chikabala was in the Zambian team that travelled to Senegal to take part in the 1992 African Nations Cup. This time Bwalya and Melu returned and Chikabala was named in the starting line-up as Zambia overcame favourites  Egypt 1–0 in a thrilling opening encounter in Ziguinchor. With high expectations of a first ever Nations Cup trophy among soccer fans back home, Zambia’s progress was derailed when it was discovered that there was a ten-fold disparity in remuneration between the foreign-based professionals like Bwalya, Melu and Efford Chabala, and the local players. 

Despite being based in Belgium with Aalst, Chikabala was stunned to discover that his wages were being pegged at the locals’ rate, a situation which almost saw him walk out on the team. He was however persuaded to stay by the coaching staff but the damage had already been done and it was a dispirited Zambian team that faced the Ivory Coast in the quarterfinals and fell to Donald Sie’s extra-time goal. This turned out to be Chikabala’s last game for Zambia.

Chikabala made such an impression playing for Zambia that Zamalek star Mahmoud Abdul-Razek, better known as Shikabala was nicknamed after him by Egyptian fans.

Coaching career
Chikabala took his first steps in coaching at his boyhood club Chambishi FC as player-coach in 1993 though he did not stay long and headed to Zimbabwe where joined Mangura FC as a player and later took over as coach. He led them to the BP Cup final in 1995 where they lost 4-0 to Dynamos. 

He left Mhangura in early 1997 and joined Lancashire Steel FC in Kwekwe and held the position of coach until his death later that year.

Death
In late 1997, Chikabala became ill and on 12 December was admitted to Redcliff Medical Centre suffering from meningitis. He was moved to Kwekwe General Hospital when his condition deteriorated and he died on 27 December 1997. 

His body was transported to his home town of Chambishi where he was put to rest three days later.

References

External links

11v11.com

1965 births
1997 deaths
People from Copperbelt Province
Association football forwards
Zambian footballers
Zambian expatriate footballers
Zambia international footballers
1990 African Cup of Nations players
1992 African Cup of Nations players
Zambian football managers
Olympic footballers of Zambia
Footballers at the 1988 Summer Olympics
C.S. Marítimo players
S.C. Eendracht Aalst players
Primeira Liga players
Belgian Pro League players
Expatriate footballers in Portugal
Expatriate footballers in Belgium
Expatriate footballers in Zimbabwe
AIDS-related deaths in Zimbabwe